Operation Murat, which was launched on 23 April 1998, by the Turkish Army against the Kurdistan Workers' Party (PKK) in the Turkey's South-Eastern Hakkâri Province. It is said to have been the largest Turkish military operation in the entire Kurdish–Turkish conflict or even the largest Turkish military operation since the foundation of the Republic of Turkey.

The Turkish Army used 40,000 troops to pursue 450 Kurdish guerillas led by Murat Karayılan. Turkish forces however failed to kill or capture Karayılan after they cornered him in Kulp, Diyarbakir, in May.

During the first three days of the operation, there were clashes in Diyarbakir, Bingöl, Muş and Bitlis. Within Diyarbakir province, the clashes were concentrated around Kulp, Lice and Hani and in Bingöl Province, they were centered on Genç. The military declared they killed 58 militants, captured 3 militants and lost 3 security forces during the first three days.  Militants downed a military plane in Kulp, whereafter an Armenian businessman was detained.

Pro-PKK sources have alleged that former PKK military commander Şemdin Sakık aided Turkish forces during the operation, after he was captured by Turkish forces shortly after leaving the PKK to join forces with the Kurdistan Democratic Party.

See also
October 2007 clashes in Hakkâri

References

1998 in Turkey
Murat
History of Hakkâri Province
History of the Kurdistan Workers' Party
Murat
April 1998 events in Turkey
May 1998 events in  Turkey